Mifflin County Airport  is a public airport in Mifflin County, Pennsylvania. It is in Reedsville, five miles northwest of Lewistown. It is owned by the Mifflin County Airport Authority. The FAA's National Plan of Integrated Airport Systems for 2009-2013 called it a general aviation airport.

Many U.S. airports use the same three-letter location identifier for the FAA and IATA, but this airport is RVL to the FAA and RED to the IATA.

Facilities
Its one runway, 6/24, is 5,001 by 75 feet (1,524 x 23 m) asphalt.

In the year ending February 20, 2009 the airport had 19,400 aircraft operations, average 53 per day: 97% general aviation and 3% air taxi. 33 aircraft were then based at the airport: 85% single-engine, 6% multi-engine, 3% jet and 6% glider.

There is an AWOS-3 on the field.

Soaring contests 
Mifflin County Airport is a popular site for gliding competitions and has hosted 10 national championships and four regional championships since 1990.

References

External links 
 Mifflin County Airport, official site
 Mifflin County Airport at Pennsylvania DOT Bureau of Aviation
 Aerial view in April 1994 from USGS The National Map
 

Airports in Pennsylvania
County airports in Pennsylvania
Transportation buildings and structures in Mifflin County, Pennsylvania